Emma Kinema is an American labor organizer and the senior campaign lead of CODE-CWA, the Communication Workers of America's Campaign to Organize Digital Employees. In the late 2010s, while working as a quality assurance tester, Kinema volunteered as a games industry organizer and co-founder of Game Workers Unite. She was hired by the CWA union in 2020 to lead their initiative to organize video game and tech workers, the first American initiative of its kind in those sectors. 

As of August 2022, the CODE-CWA campaign has organized over 3000 union members in various sub-industries of the tech sector across over 25 bargaining units in the last two years of organizing.

Career 

Emma Kinema's career background in the video game industry has spanned a variety of roles across multiple types and sizes of game companies. She had also been involved in labor organizing since the early 2010s. By the late 2010s, those interests coincided for her as a labor organizer in the games industry. While working full-time as a quality assurance tester for an Orange County, California-based game developer, Kinema became a founding member of Game Workers Unite, a group of volunteers organizing the video games industry. Kinema and games writer Liz Ryerson were the main figures behind the group's initial expansion in early 2018. This volunteering, which she estimated as 60 hours per week, included giving and receiving training and was supported by crowdfunded monthly income. Kinema's interest in organizing was propelled by her first- and secondhand experiences with crunch time (long periods of overtime), toxic workplace culture, and issues related to layoffs, pay gaps, discrimination, health care, and artistic credit attribution. She had previously trained with the Industrial Workers of the World.

Kinema helped to organize a panel on labor at the March 2019 Game Developers' Conference and in May, helped to organize the walkout at Riot Games over its handling of sex discrimination. She assisted Riot workers in creating an organizing committee after they attended a 2018 Game Workers Unite meeting and further advised the organizers via phone. Variety named the Game Workers Unite organizers and Kinema (as the group's most public figure) among the most influential people in video games in 2018.

CODE-CWA 

Following two years of discussions, in January 2020, Communications Workers of America hired Kinema to organize workers in the video game and tech industries, the first American union initiative in those sectors. Her initiative with Wes McEnany is named Campaign to Organize Digital Employees (CODE). She plans to use the Communications Workers of America's infrastructure to fight issues including crunch time, layoffs, and workplace ethics, which she has construed as working conditions for employees who choose employers based on their ability to impact society. She also emphasized the slow-moving nature of organizing through one-on-one relationships. CODE organized the New York-based tech company Glitch in March and contracted writers for Voltage Entertainment, whose successful July strike led to pay increases and workplace transparency. In early 2020, Kinema said that she was involved with almost every video game worker unionization drive in the United States. CODE campaigns include both small and large, multinational game companies.

The campaign has unionized multiple companies, including the petition website Change.org, the role-playing game publishing company Paizo, and the indie video game studio Vodeo. CODE-CWA has also assisted Activision Blizzard staff in their organization efforts.

Organizing analysis 
In conversation with labor journalist Sarah Jaffe, Kinema highlighted "the socialists and communists behind the CIO and its predecessor organizations" as a great examples of how generating good organizing tactics requires "a political and historical analysis of the state of things, and being able to apply our tactics based off that analysis." This method of analysis is what led her to being involved in organizing the tech industry saying "there's a deep, strategic importance to organizing in technology because our modern tech industry is at the heart of every other industry. You can't have a global logistics infrastructure without the software that enables it. You can't have automated manufacturing on a global scale without the technology that does it. Understanding that structural position of tech, that leverage that comes from the structural position we have, [and] where we exist in the context of the global economy is essential."

Kinema believes that to build unity among the working class, organizers don't win by downplaying social and demographic differences between workers, but instead by diving "fully into those struggles that most center [workers of color, LGBTQ+ workers, and immigrants] and [building] up the organizers who are coming out of those natural fights." When asked about how to organize new industries with little union history, Kinema has said that while organizing smaller groups of workers is an imperfect solution to the big picture of organizing, workers earning any semblance of power is a crucial first step from which the workforce can build on. She has also said that she believes organizing in the tech industry, and organizing the unorganized in general, is essential for improving the labor movement overall.

On the question of companies' efforts to oppose unionization, Kinema has said "[workers are] entering a new phase in organizing... It's not worth fighting the arc of history... this industry will be organized, one way or another." Kinema has described the video game industry's conditions as having the worst characteristics of the tech and media industries. Kinema believes the biggest obstacle to widespread new organizing in tech and games isn't logistics or resources, but instead a question of education, ideology, and changing culture.

Personal life 

Her name is a pseudonym chosen so that she could continue working in the games industry without risking dismissal or reprisal under at-will employment. She described undergoing "pretty extreme lengths" to separate her full-time career from her work as an organizer.

Kinema, a queer, trans woman, has spoken about the power of unionization to connect economic rights and social justice.

See also 

 Claire Stapleton
 Liz Fong-Jones
 Jaz Brisack
 Cher Scarlett
 Jessica Gonzalez

References

External links 

21st-century American women
American social activists
American social justice activists
American women trade unionists
American video game programmers
Communications Workers of America people
Living people
Queer women
Trade unionists from California
Transgender women
Workers' rights activists
Year of birth missing (living people)